Monwar Hossain Nannu (27 August 1948 – 16 February 2008) was a Bangladeshi  football player during the 1970s and early 1980s.  Initially, He played as an attacking midfielder for Abahani Krira Chakra in Dhaka League. Following an injury in the mid 1970s, he moved to the central defender position and excelled in that position as well. He was a member of Bangladesh's first national football team.

Career

Early years
In the early sixties while still at school, Nannu practiced at the EPG Press field and Ex-Pakistan national team player Syed Abdur Rashid Chunna who coached EPG Press (now BG Press) let Nannu train with the EPG Press football team, when there were not enough players present. In 1965, Nannu got an opportunity to play for the 'B' team of Azad Sporting, who were then a third division team. Nannu went onto mature by playing in the second division with Rahmatganj MFS in 1966 and Dilkusha SC in 1967.

Nannu made his Dhaka League debut for EPG Press in 1968, playing as a left-back against Dhaka Wanderers. In 1969, he moved to Wari Dhaka. He then played for Mohammedan Sporting Club, after the 1971 Liberation War. Nannu, marshalled the Mohammedan defense alongside his brother Shamsul Alam Manju. However, was unable to win the league title during his three-year stay at the club.

Prominence
Bangladesh's first national team coach Sheikh Shaheb Ali, Nannu for the Bangladesh national team in 1973, for the Mardeka Cup, during their first international tour. During the tournament he scored against South Vietnam in a 1–1 draw. The tournament turned out to be his only foreign trip with the national team, as injury ruled him out from the 1975 Merdeka Cup. Nannu quit the national team in 1978, only to return to the squad during the 1980 AFC Asian Cup qualifiers held in Dhaka. 

In 1974, he joined Abahani Krira Chakra from Mohammedan SC. It was Sheikh Kamal who persuaded him to join Abahani, after Nannu had a row with his brother Manju. The same year Nannu won his first Dhaka League title, under Irish coach  William Bill Hart. Nannu played a big role in rebuilding Abahani after the dark episode of 1975, after the Assassination of Sheikh Mujibur Rahman, which also claimed the life of one of the clubs founder Sheikh Kamal. After breaking his leg, Nannu stayed out of the game for two years, returning to football in 1977, transitioning into the country's best attacking midfielder under Bill Hart's passing based football. He remained at Abahani until 1982, winning the league title two more times (1977 & 1981).

In 1978, during a Dhaka Derby, Nannu was captain of Abahani while his brother Manju captained Mohammedan. At the time the game was the most anticipated sports rivalry in the country. However, the two captains refused to shake hands at the beginning. Officials of both parties were worried about the matter as, a fight would have brought in a storm of criticism, and eventually the brothers were convinced into shaking hands before the game got underway. This incident later became a notable part in the country's football history. He ended his career while playing for Rahmatganj MFS, in 1983.

1978 Asian Games controversy
In 1978, Bangladesh participated in Asian Games for the first time. Nannu, being the senior most player in the squad, was originally nominated as the captain for the Bangkok event. The Federation changed their decision and goalkeeper Shahidur Rahman Shantoo from MSC was appointed the new captain. 7 Abahani players, Khandaker Rakibul Islam, Shafiul Arefin Tutul, Khurshid Alam Babul, Amalesh Sen, Kazi Salahuddin, Ashrafuddin Ahmed Chunnu, and Nannu, withdrew from the team in protest. The much depleted Bangladesh team struggled in the tournament losing 1–0 to Malaysia and 3–0 to India. Following this incident, the federation generally tried to pick national team captains outside the two big Dhaka teams for the next few years.

Personal life and legacy

Nannu's younger brother Shamsul Alam Monju played as a right-back for the Mohammedan Sporting Club. In 1978, Nannu was leading the Abahani team while his brother led MSC to the title. Later, they played together at Rahmatganj MFS. Nannu was married to Shahana Hossain.

He won the 1974 Bangladesh Sports Writers Association (BSWA) Footballer of the Year prize. 

In 1998, Nannu received the National Sports Awards, but he could not claim it himself due to cancer. In the same year, a charity match for his treatment was held in Bangladesh, USA and Canada.

On 16 February 2008, Nannu passed away due to his cancer. In 2008, Sonali Otit Club introduced an award for the football referees and named it "Monwar Hossain Nannu Award".

Honours

Club 
Mohammedan Sporting Club 
Independence Cup = 1972

Abahani Krira Chakra 
Dhaka League = 1974, 1977, 1981
Federation Cup = 1982
Liberation Cup = 1977

Awards and accolades
1974 − Sports Writers Association's Best Footballer Award
1998 − National Sports Awards

References

1948 births
2008 deaths
People from Jamalpur District
Bangladeshi footballers
Bangladesh international footballers
Association football midfielders
Mohammedan SC (Dhaka) players
Abahani Limited (Dhaka) players
Rahmatganj MFS players
Recipients of the Bangladesh National Sports Award